Browne Lake may refer to:

 Browne Lake, a reservoir in Chambers County, Alabama, United States
 Browne Lake, a reservoir in Gwinnett County, Georgia, United States
 Browne Lake (Utah), a reservoir in Daggett County, Utah, United States
 Browne Lake Provincial Park, a park in British Columbia, Canada
 Brownes Lake, a reservoir in Beaverhead County, Montana, United States

See also
 Brown Lake
 Browns Lake

References